Sone Pe Suhaaga ( Borax on Gold, met. ‘‘Icing on the Cake’’ or ‘’Cherry on Top’’) is a 1988 Indian action film, produced by Abdul Hafiz Nadiadwala on A. G. Films Pvt Ltd banner and directed by K. Bapaiah. The film stars Dharmendra, Jeetendra, Anil Kapoor, Poonam Dhillon, Sridevi, Kimi Katkar in lead roles and music composed by Bappi Lahiri. The film was the tenth highest grossing Indian Film of 1988.

Plot
The film begins with a sincere Constable Viswanath living with his wife Usha, elder son Vijay, and twin boys. Once, a stranger Bashir Ahmed surrenders to Viswanath confessing his sin of stealing Rs.10 lakhs. At that juncture, a spiteful & covetous Inspector Tejaa connives by killing Viswanath and incriminates Bashir Ahmed. Witnessing it, Usha escapes with the children, when tragically, one of the twins dies. During that plight, she decides to immerse the corpse in the river but unfortunately, throws the living child. Moreover, Tejaa re-attacks which Vijay also detaches.

Years roll by, and Tejaa grows up as a kingpin in the netherworld. Vijay is self-made, as unbeknownst he antagonizes Tejaa by filing a suit against his son Joginder in the murder convict. Hence, Tejaa falsifies the judiciary in cahoots with Justice Nyaychand Rastogi and purports an orphan Ravi as Joginder who is Usha’s survived twin son. Besides, Vikram is a self-righteous ruffian. Tejaa detects his caliber and whisks him to thwart his die-hard enemy Vijay. Meena is a pickpocket that often contretemps with Vijay and they fall in love. Fortuitously, by her Vijay finds the whereabouts of his mother and retrieves her.

Now the venomous arraigns Vijay under false allegation. Meanwhile, Bashir Ahmed is released, when he detects and revolts on Tejaa but is seized by Police. Here, stunningly Vikram turns into a CBI officer who is appointed to nail Tejaa. The next, Bashir Ahmed comes across Usha through whom Vikram learns the bestialities of Tejaa. Forthwith, he meets Vijay in prison to pursue Tejaa’s vengefulness against him. Prior, his close friend Dr. Premnath breaks his kidney racket of Tejaa on the day of his nuptial with Advocate Sharddha. After tying the wedding chain Joginder shoots him dead. Before dying, he affirms the name of the culprit, and Vijay still struggling for justice. However, Vikram acquits Vijay, as well as, he loves widow Sharddha. Ongoing, unexpectedly Meena is shown as the daughter of Tejaa. Despite this, she stands for piety and Vijay too accepts her. Ravi is in love with his collegian Usha granddaughter of Dinu the allegiant of Vijay whom he treats as his own. Then, Usha identifies Ravi as her son and embraces him. Accordingly, Tejaa seizes her and extorts Ravi. Thus, he is compelled to concede as Joginder and takes up the death row. In tandem, Nyaychand Rastogi is backstabbed by Tejaa who divulges the fact as his death statement and the judiciary frees Ravi. At last, 3 valorous cease the Tejaa & Joginder. Finally, the movie ends on a happy note with the wedding of 3 couples.

Cast

 Nutan as Usha
 Dharmendra as CBI Officer Ashwini Kumar / Vikram Dada
 Jeetendra as Vijay Kumar
 Anil Kapoor as Ravi 
 Poonam Dhillon as Advocate Shraddha
 Sridevi as Meena
 Kimi Katkar as Usha 
 Satyendra Kapoor as Dinanath
 Bharat Bhushan as Kashinath
 Nirupa Roy as Mrs. Kashinath
 Navin Nischol as Constable Vishwanath
 Kader Khan as Bashir Ahmed
 Shakti Kapoor as Joginder
 Paresh Rawal as Teja
 Anupam Kher as Justice Nyaychand Rastogi 
 Asrani as Conman
 Bharat Kapoor as Prakash 
 Pinchoo Kapoor as Jailor
 Ajinkya Deo as Dr. Prem
 Tom Alter as Dr. Rex
 Mahesh Anand as Robert

Soundtrack

References

External links
 

1990 films
1990s Hindi-language films
Films directed by K. Bapayya
Films scored by Bappi Lahiri
1980s Hindi-language films